Arthur Lewis Davies (26 January 1913 – 9 December 2011), the younger brother of Rhys Davies, was a Welsh librarian and philanthropist who in his later years established a foundation (the Rhys Davies Trust) devoted to the promotion of Welsh writing in English.

Early life
Davies was born in the coalmining village of Blaenclydach, near Tonypandy, to parents who operated a grocery store and were careful to educate all their six children to keep them from having to be employed in the coal mines. Like his more famous brother Rhys, he was gay and for that reason decided against a career in the Anglican priesthood.

Career
He studied History at the University College of Wales, Aberystwyth, later training there also at their College of Librarianship to become a librarian. In 1937 Davies secured an assistant librarian position at the Daily Mirror which he held for ten years. He then went to Odhams Press as their chief librarian in 1952 — a position he held until his retirement from the succeeding company IPC Books in 1978.

In 1990, he decided to use the proceeds of substantial bequests to help promote the literary reputation of his brother and other Anglo-Welsh writers.

References

External links
 Rhys Davies Short Story Competition Anthologies at Swansea University. Accessed July 6 2022.

1913 births
2011 deaths
Welsh gay men
Welsh philanthropists
Welsh librarians
People from Clydach Vale
20th-century British philanthropists